There are several stromal cell derived factors:

 Stromal cell-derived factor-1 (SDF-1, SDF1, Sdf1)
 Stromal cell-derived factor-1 alpha (SDF-1a, SDF1a, Sdf1α)
 Stromal cell-derived factor-2 (SDF-2, SDF2, Sdf2)
 Stromal cell-derived factor-3 (SDF-3, SDF3, Sdf3)
 Stromal cell-derived factor-4 (SDF-4, SDF4, Sdf4)